Sigurjón Sighvatsson (born 15 June 1952), also known as Joni Sighvatsson, is an Icelandic Hollywood film producer and businessman.

Sigurjon (Joni) Sighvatsson, a veteran producer with over 50 feature films, television series, and documentaries to his credit, is the principal of Palomar Pictures, an independent production company, as well as chairman of Scandinavian film distributor/producer Scanbox Emntertainment.

Sighvatsson has worked with some of the most successful filmmakers in the industry, including David Lynch, Kathryn Bigelow, Jim Sheridan, Julian Schnabel and multiple Academy Award nominees and winners. Among his films are The Hundred-Year-Old Man Who Climbed Out of the Window and Disappeared, Brothers, Z for Zachariah and Killer Elite, as well as classics such as Wild at Heart, Arlington Road and Basquiat.

Sighvatsson also continues to be a significant force in the world of art films. After having paved the way for visual artists moving into feature films with Schnabel's highly acclaimed Basquiat, Sighvatsson has also produced the groundbreaking Zidane: A 21st Century Portrait, as well as the controversial Destricted, a collection of short films by some of the world's leading artists focusing on the concept of pornography.

Career 
Before coming to the United States, Sighvatsson enjoyed a successful career as a musician in his native Iceland, founding the country's first recording studio at the age of 21. After finishing a B.A. in Literature from the University of Iceland, Sighvatsson came to Los Angeles on a Fulbright Scholarship to earn his MFA in the Graduate Film Studies program at USC. He then was invited to and joined the Director's Program at the American Film Institute.

In 1986, Sighvatsson co-founded Propaganda Films, which quickly became the leading music video and commercial production company in the world before expanding into feature films with Red Rock West, Kalifornia, and David Lynch's Wild At Heart which won the coveted Palme d'Or at the Cannes Film Festival. At Propaganda, Sighvatsson launched the careers of such directors as David Fincher, Michael Bay, and Spike Jonze.

Sighvatsson has also been involved with numerous television shows, including the Emmy-nominated "Armistead Maupin's Tales of the City," the innovative cult classic "Twin Peaks," the triple ACE Award-winning anthology series "Fallen Angels," the quadruple ACE-winning "Heat Wave," as well as the popular original "Beverly Hills 90210". In 1995, Sighvatsson became the founding president of Lakeshore Entertainment, where he produced or executive produced films such as Polish Wedding, 200 Cigarettes and Arlington Road.

In 1999, Sighvatsson became the controlling shareholder in Palomar Pictures, another pioneer in music videos and television commercials and cultivated a new generation of top directors including Joseph Kahn, Gary McKendry and Marcos Siega. In 2006 Sighvatsson acquired Scanbox Entertainment, a leading Scandinavian film distributor as well as heritage clothing company 66 North in Iceland, which he built into an award winning international outdoor brand.

Sighvatsson has served in various industry and civic organizations including, as president of the American Cinematheque in Los Angeles, and as a board member of the AICP (Association of Independent Commercial Producers),  The American-Scandinavian Foundation, the ACLU of Southern California, the Ocean Park Community Center, and currently serves on the Hammer Museum Board of Overseers. Sighvatsson is also the Honorary Consul General for Iceland in Southern California.

Producer selected filmography
He was a producer in all films unless otherwise noted.

Film

Production manager

Thanks

Television

References

External links

1952 births
Icelandic film producers
Living people
AFI Conservatory alumni
People from Reykjavík
USC School of Cinematic Arts alumni